Little Old New York may refer to:
 Little Old New York (1940 film), an American black-and-white historical drama
 Little Old New York (1923 film), an American silent historical drama film